Pakistan participated in the 1998 Asian Games in Bangkok, Thailand from 6 to 20 December 1998.

Medallists

Cue Sports
 Shaukat Ali

Hockey

Kabaddi

Squash
 Zarak Jahan Khan
 Amjad Khan

References

Nations at the 1998 Asian Games
1998
Asian Games